John T. Morgan Academy is a school in Selma, Alabama, USA, founded in 1965 as a segregation academy.

History
The school is named for John Tyler Morgan, a confederate general, senator and grand dragon of the Ku Klux Klan, who as senator advanced several bills to legalize lynching of African-Americans. It was founded in 1965, shortly after the Selma to Montgomery marches. The first classes in 1965 were held in the John Tyler Morgan House until a new campus was built in 1967.

After 41 years, the school admitted its first black student in 2008.

Bryan Oliver became the headmaster in 2021.

References 

Educational institutions established in 1965
Education in Selma, Alabama
Private elementary schools in Alabama
Schools accredited by the Southern Association of Colleges and Schools
Segregation academies in Alabama
Confederate States of America monuments and memorials in Alabama
1965 establishments in Alabama